City TV may refer to:
 Citytv, a Canadian broadcast television network
 Citytv Bogotá, a local television station in Colombia which licenses branding from Citytv
 Citytv.com.co, a Colombian video sharing website
 City TV (Bosnia and Herzegovina)
 City TV (Bulgaria), a cable music channel in Bulgaria
 City TV (Singapore), a defunct channel owned by Mediacorp
 City8, a proposed local television channel in Birmingham, United Kingdom known as "City TV" during initial planning